Polophylax (Greek: guardian of the celestial [south] pole) was a southern constellation that lay where Tucana and Grus now are. 

It was introduced by Petrus Plancius in the small celestial planispheres on his large wall map of 1592. It is also shown on his smaller world map of 1594 and on world maps copied from Plancius.

It was superseded by the twelve constellations which Petrus Plancius formed in late 1597 or early 1598 from the southern star observations of Pieter Dircksz Keyser and Frederik de Houtman.

External links
Polophylax at Ian Ridpath's Star Tales

Former constellations